Apsidocnemus is a genus of beetles in the family Carabidae, containing the following species:

 Apsidocnemus catalai Alluaud, 1936
 Apsidocnemus gracilitarsis Jeannel, 1948
 Apsidocnemus vadoni Jeannel, 1948

References

Pterostichinae